Rap-Murr-Phobia (The Fear of Real Hip-Hop) is the fifth solo studio album by American rapper Keith Murray. It was released on July 31, 2007 through Koch Records. Production was handled by Erick Sermon, except for two tracks which were produced by Mike City and Shuko. It features guest appearances from L.O.D., Junior, Baggy Bones, Bosie & Ryze, Def Squad, Jamal, Method Man, Ming Bolla, Taya, Tyrese and Unique. The album debuted at number 52 on the Billboard 200 and number 7 on the Top R&B/Hip-Hop Albums in the Unites States, selling 13,000 units in its first week.

Track listing

Personnel

Keith Murray – main artist
Tone Kapone – featured artist (track 1)
Kelly "Kel-Vicious" Brister – featured artist (tracks: 4, 12, 16)
Reginald "Redman" Noble – featured artist (track 6)
Erick Sermon – featured artist (track 6), producer (tracks: 1-3, 5-8, 10-18), mixing (tracks: 1, 2, 4-7, 9-16), executive producer
Tyrese Gibson – featured artist (track 8)
Junior – featured artist (tracks: 8, 15)
Jamal Phillips – featured artist (track 10)
Clifford "Method Man" Smith – featured artist (track 11)
Gerald "50 Grand" Berlin – featured artist (tracks: 11, 12, 16)
D. "DL" Welch – featured artist (tracks: 12, 16)
C. "Olu" Olujobi – featured artist (tracks: 12, 16)
D. Murray – featured artist (tracks: 12, 16)
Taya – featured artist (track 13)
Baggy Bones – featured artist (track 13)
Deanna "Uneek" Bennett – featured artist (track 14)
Ming Bolla – featured artist (track 16)
Bosie – featured artist (track 16)
Ryze – featured artist (track 16)
Michael "Mike City" Flowers – producer (track 4)
Christoph "Shuko" Bauss – producer (track 9)
David "Gordo" Strickland – mixing (tracks: 1, 2, 4-7, 9-16)
Tommy Uzzo – mixing (tracks: 3, 8)
Arnold Mischkulnig – mastering (tracks: 1, 2, 4-7, 9-16)
Chris Athens – mastering (tracks: 3, 8)
Paul Grosso – creative director
Andrew Kelley – art direction, design
Beatrice Genter – photography
Mike Schrieber – photography
Todd Westphal – photography
Alyson Abbagnaro – A&R
Mary Sierra – management
Michael "Blue" Williams – management
Marleny Dominguez – management
Christian Mariano – management

Charts

References

External links

2007 albums
MNRK Music Group albums
Albums produced by Mike City
Keith Murray (rapper) albums
Albums produced by Erick Sermon